The Philippine Children's Television Foundation is a non-profit organization that pioneered educational television in the Philippines. It was initially formed to partner with Sesame Workshop (formerly Children's Television Workshop) to create Sesame!, later known as Batibot.

Books
These are books published by the PCTF, other than those directly relating to Batibot.

Buhay-Bata
Nasaan ang Tsinelas Ko
Ang Prinsesang Ayaw Matulog
Ang Kuya ni Karina
Ang Kaibigan ng Dilim
Si Paula Oink-Oink
Gusto Ko ng Pansit Ngayon
Ayokong Pumasok sa Paaralan
Nagsasabi Na si Patpat
Dagat sa Kama ni Troy
Ang Prinsipeng Ayaw Maligo

Karapatan ng Bata
Isang Mundong Makabata
Pasan Ko si Bunso
Ang Batang Ayaw Gumising
Sina Dosol at Mokopoy
Kagila-gilalas Na Kahon
Ang Bata sa Basket
Sa Ilalim ng Dagat
Si Owel, ang Batang Matakaw
Ason, Luming at Teresing
Sa Bagong Planeta

Aklat Tsinoy
Kumusta!
Teksto: Rene O. Villanueva at Feny de los Angeles-Bautista
Disenyo: Kora Dandan-Albano
Paglalapat ng kulay sa pabalat sa pamamagitan ng computer: Ramon C. Sunico
Sino Ako?
Teksto: Rene O. Villanueva at Feny de los Angeles-Bautista
Disenyo: Joanne de Leon
Paglalapat ng kulay sa pabalat sa pamamagitan ng computer: Ramon C. Sunico
Ang Pamilya Ko
Teksto: Rene O. Villanueva at Feny de los Angeles-Bautista
Disenyo: Joanne de Leon
Paglalapat ng kulay sa pabalat sa pamamagitan ng computer: Ramon C. Sunico
Sa Parke
Teksto: Rene O. Villanueva at Feny de los Angeles-Bautista
Disenyo: Kora Dandan-Albano
Paglalapat ng kulay sa pabalat sa pamamagitan ng computer: Ramon C. Sunico

TV shows
1896 Kalayaan (GMA Network)
Batang Batibot (GMA Network)
Batibot (RPN, ABS-CBN, PTV, GMA Network and TV5)
Bulilit (GMA Network)
Koko Kwik Kwak (GMA Network)
Pin Pin (PTV) - very first Chinese language children's show on Philippine TV
PG (Parent's Guide) (GMA Network; developed by GMA News and Public Affairs)

References

Foundations based in the Philippines
Television in the Philippines
Children's television
Television organizations